Daniel James Newton (born 18 March 1991) is an English professional footballer who plays as a forward for National League club Boreham Wood.

Newton began his career at Hinckley United, where he broke into the first-team in 2010 and spent two seasons. He joined fellow National League North club Nuneaton Town, although spent most of his time there on loan back at Hinckley United and then at Barwell of the Southern Football League. He joined Barwell on a permanent basis at the start of the 2013–14 season, before making the step back up to join Brackley Town in October 2013. In January 2014, he signed for Leamington, where he was the club's top goalscorer during the 2014–15 season. 

A move to Tamworth, also of the National League North, followed in May 2015. After two seasons at Tamworth, Newton signed for League Two club Stevenage ahead of the 2017–18 season. He was the club's top goalscorer and was also named as Stevenage's Player of the Year during his first season there. He spent four years at Stevenage before signing for Solihull Moors in August 2021, where he spent one season. Newton signed for Boreham Wood of the National League in July 2022.

Early life
Newton was born in Liverpool, Merseyside. His family relocated to Leicester when he was two years old and he grew up in the East Midlands.

Career

Early career
Newton began his career at Conference North club Hinckley United, breaking into the first-team towards the latter stages of the 2009–10 season. He scored his first goal for Hinckley in the club's 3–2 win over Harrogate Town on 24 April 2010, coming on as a second-half substitute and scoring the winning goal in the 91st minute to keep Hinckley's play-off hopes intact. Newton remained at Hinckley for the 2010–11 season, making 28 appearances during the season, of which 18 were from the substitutes' bench. He scored three goals in a season where Hinckley finished in 15th place in the league. The 2011–12 season served as Newton's breakthrough season in terms of consistent first-team starting appearances. He made 48 appearances during the season in all competitions, scoring 13 goals, forging a strike partnership with Andre Gray over the course of the season.

At the end of the 2011–12 season, Newton left Hinckley and signed for Nuneaton Town, another Conference North team. Having made no appearances in Nuneaton's opening games for the 2012–13 season, he was loaned back to former club Hinckley United on an initial one-month loan in September 2012, which was later extended to three months. He made 11 appearances and scored twice during his loan spell back at Hinckley. Newton was recalled from his loan by Nuneaton in November, and made his debut as a 60th-minute substitute in Nuneaton's 1–0 loss to Telford United in the FA Trophy on 24 November 2012. He made 10 appearances for Nuneaton in all competitions, of which five were starting appearances, before he was once again loaned out, this time for the remainder of the season to Barwell of the Southern Football League in March 2013. Newton made his first appearance for Barwell on 9 March 2013, playing the opening 82 minutes before he was sent-off for a sliding challenge on St Albans City's James Comley in a 3–1 home defeat. The resulting three-match suspension spanned over a month, after which Newton played in all of Barwell's remaining league fixtures, scoring his first goal in a 2–1 away win against Kettering Town, a game in which he assisted the other goal. He scored three goals in seven games during the brief loan agreement.

He left Nuneaton at the end of the season and opted to join Barwell on a permanent basis in the summer of 2013, with the club having been relocated from the Southern Football League to the Northern Premier League, on non-contract terms to start the 2013–14 season. He scored his first goals of the new season courtesy of a 13-minute hat-trick in a 3–2 away win against Stafford Rangers on 20 August 2013, a game in which his pace was described as being "too much for the Stafford defence". Newton scored 11 goals in 13 matches in the opening two months of the season, as well as being named as Man of the Match in three of those matches. His early season form caught the attention of Conference North club Brackley Town and he made the step back up a division by joining Brackley at the end of October 2013. He made his debut for Brackley in the club's 3–2 win over Boston United on 2 November 2013, coming on as a substitute in the match. Newton made eight appearances during his time at Brackley, seven of which came from the substitutes' bench.

Leamington
After just two months at Brackley, Newton joined fellow Conference North club Leamington on a contract until the end of the 2013–14 season in January 2014. He was part of a deal that saw Stefan Moore make the reverse move from Leamington to Brackley. Just ten days after making a second-half appearance against Leamington for Brackley, Newton made his Leamington debut on 11 January 2014, playing the opening 78 minutes in a 0–0 away draw at Solihull Moors. He scored his first goal for the Warwickshire club a week later, scoring the first goal of the game in an eventual 2–1 loss to Harrogate Town. He remained a first-team regular for the remainder of the season, scoring 10 goals in 18 appearances.

Newton signed a new one-year deal to remain at Leamington for the 2014–15 season. He initially struggled to recapture his goalscoring form displayed at the end of the previous season, and went the first eight matches without finding the net. He scored his first goal of the season on 13 September 2014, briefly giving Leamington the lead before they ultimately fell to a 2–1 away loss to Barrow. Newton was made captain midway through the season. He went on to score 11 goals in Leamington's final 12 league matches, taking his goal tally for the season to 16, during a season that saw Leamington relegated to the Southern Football League. Newton was the club's top goalscorer during the season and also won three end-of-season awards, including being named the club's Player of the Year. He made a total of 60 appearances in all competitions during his two-year spell, scoring 30 times.

Tamworth
Newton joined National League North club Tamworth in May 2015, signing a one-year deal for the 2015–16 season. Newton made his Tamworth debut on 8 August 2015, playing the whole 90 minutes in a 1–0 victory over North Ferriby United at The Lamb Ground. Despite his prolific goalscoring form towards the end of the previous season at Leamington, it took Newton fourteen games to score his first goals for Tamworth, opening his account courtesy of a brace in a 4–0 away win over Lowestoft Town on 24 October 2015. He followed this up by scoring the only goal of the game a week later as Tamworth secured a 1–0 victory against Hednesford Town. Newton scored four goals in a 5–3 away win at Stalybridge Celtic on 23 January 2016. In doing so he became the first Tamworth player to score four goals in a single game since 1999. Newton scored 10 times in 36 appearances during his first season at Tamworth, with the club finishing in seventh place in National League North. Shortly after the end of the season, in May 2016, he signed a new one-year deal to remain at Tamworth for the following season.

He retained his place as a first-team regular at Tamworth during the 2016–17 season, scoring his first goal of the new season in a 2–1 victory against Telford United on 13 August 2016. A 91st-minute goal in Tamworth's 5–2 victory at Alfreton Town served as the catalyst for Newton to go on a run of scoring 13 goals in 12 matches, which lasted from late August to mid November 2016. This run included four separate braces in victories over Gloucester City, Curzon Ashton, Darlington and Harrogate Town respectively. He was a consistent goalscorer throughout the season, which included a run of 13 goals in 12 matches to end the season, including five goals within the space of three days when he scored twice against Alfreton Town and followed this up with a hat-trick in a 4–0 victory at Stalybridge Celtic. Newton scored 28 goals in 39 appearances during the season, finishing the season as the club's top goalscorer in a season where Tamworth finished in ninth place. He won five end-of-season awards, including being named Tamworth's Player of the Year. During his time at Tamworth, Newton scored 39 goals in 79 appearances.

Stevenage
Newton was invited to participate at the V9 Academy in June 2017, an academy launched by Jamie Vardy to help non-league footballers into the Football League. He attended the week-long camp, held at Manchester City's first-team campus, where he played in three friendlies and was watched by over 60 professional scouts. He attracted the attention of "a number of EFL clubs", before signing for League Two club Stevenage on a two-year deal on 19 June 2017. Newton made his competitive debut for Stevenage on the opening day of the 2017–18 season, scoring the club's third goal in a 3–3 draw with Newport County at Broadhall Way. Newton scored his first brace for the club in Stevenage's 5–2 victory over Swindon Town in the FA Cup second round on 2 December 2017. His second goal of the match, where he won the ball in his own half before proceeding to run the length of the pitch and round the goalkeeper, was voted the best goal of the round. Newton ended his first season at Stevenage as the club's top goalscorer, scoring 16 times in 51 appearances in all competitions. He was voted as Player of the Year at the club's end-of-season awards.

Newton began the 2018–19 season as a first-team regular, scoring his first goal of the season in a 1–0 victory over Macclesfield Town on 8 September 2018. He suffered a number of "little injuries" in the opening months of the season, including an ankle injury that ultimately kept him out of first-team action for a month. He returned on 3 November 2018, scoring the winning goal as a 60th-minute substitute in a 3–2 win against Oldham Athletic. In February 2019, Stevenage manager Dino Maamria stated that Newton had been playing despite a persistent ankle injury, and the forward would undergo ankle surgery that would keep him out for the remainder of the season. Newton returned earlier than anticipated, coming on as a half-time substitute and scoring seven minutes later in a 2–2 away draw at Macclesfield Town on 23 March 2019. Newton made 29 appearances during the injury-disrupted season, scoring six times. Injury restricted Newton to 10 appearances throughout the 2019–20 season and he did not make an appearance that season beyond September 2019. He signed a one-year contract extension with Stevenage on 22 August 2020. He scored five times in 41 appearances during the 2020–21 season. Newton was included in the list of players released by Stevenage on 15 May 2021, with his contract expiring on 30 June 2021.

Solihull Moors
Newton signed for National League club Solihull Moors on a one-year contract on 2 August 2021. He debuted for Solihull in the club's first game of the 2021–22 season, playing the whole match in a 2–2 draw at home against Wrexham. Newton made 42 appearances during the season, scoring seven goals, as Solihull were defeated in the 2022 National League play-off Final. He was released by the club on 6 June 2022.

Boreham Wood
A free agent ahead of the 2022–23 season, Newton joined fellow National League club Boreham Wood on 1 July 2022. He made his debut for Boreham Wood in the club's first match of the season, scoring the only goal of the game in a 1–0 away victory at Southend United.

Style of play
Newton plays as a forward and this is his preferred position. He has also been deployed on the left wing. His "relentless style of play" means he has been likened to Jamie Vardy, with the forward being described as not giving "defenders a moment's rest".

Personal life
He is a supporter of Liverpool. Before turning professional in June 2017, Newton combined playing non-League football with working as a maintenance engineer in a factory that made axles for lorries.

Career statistics

Honours
Individual
 Leamington Player of the Year: 2014–15
 Tamworth Player of the Year: 2016–17
 Stevenage Player of the Year: 2017–18

References

External links

1991 births
Living people
Footballers from Liverpool
English footballers
Association football forwards
Hinckley United F.C. players
Nuneaton Borough F.C. players
Barwell F.C. players
Brackley Town F.C. players
Leamington F.C. players
Tamworth F.C. players
Stevenage F.C. players
Solihull Moors F.C. players
Boreham Wood F.C. players
National League (English football) players
Southern Football League players
Northern Premier League players
English Football League players
V9 Academy players